Kinesin family member 12 (KIF12), also known as kinesin-12, is a human protein encoded by the gene KIF12. It is part of the kinesin family of motor proteins.

Clinical significance 
Mutations in KIF12 are associated with cholestatic liver disease.

References 

Motor proteins